upright|thumb|The clock tower in 2015, Sialkot, Pakistan

The Sialkot Clock Tower also known as Iqbal Square, is situated in Saddar Bazar, Sialkot Cantonment, Pakistan. It was built in 1922.

See also

List of clock towers in Pakistan
Sialkot
Clock Tower
Ghanta Ghar (disambiguation)

References

External links
Clock Tower, Sialkot on YouTube

Clock towers in Pakistan
Towers in Pakistan
Buildings and structures in Sialkot